Elise Krieghoff (born November 18, 1993) is an American former professional soccer player who played as a forward for the Boston Breakers in the NWSL.

College career 
Krieghoff attended Cal Poly San Luis Obispo, ultimately inducted into the university's Hall of Fame in 2022. While with Cal Poly, Krieghoff was invited to train at a USWNT U-23 camp in 2014. Krieghoff's collegiate career also included making ESPN's "SportsCenter" Top 10 after scoring a goal which ranked No. 3 for the day of October 19, 2014.

Professional career
Krieghoff signed with Boston in April 2016, and scored a goal in the 76th minute for the Breakers at Houston on September 11, 2016.

She signed with Vålerenga in December 2016. Krieghoff scored a 46th-minute goal for the club during a match featuring a record crowd of 3,541 in 2017 for a 2-0 win over Kolbotn.

References

1993 births
Living people
American women's soccer players
Cal Poly Mustangs women's soccer players
Boston Breakers players
National Women's Soccer League players
Soccer players from California
Vålerenga Fotball Damer players
Women's association football forwards
American expatriate women's soccer players
Expatriate women's footballers in Norway
American expatriate sportspeople in Norway